State Route 31 (SR-31) is a state highway in Sanpete and Emery Counties in the U.S. state of Utah. The highway has been designated as part of The Energy Loop, a National Scenic Byway.

Route description

Just off State Route 31, about 15 miles (24 km) west north-west of Huntington, is Crandall Canyon, location of the Crandall Canyon coal mine. On Monday, August 6, 2007, at 2:48 A.M., the mine collapsed, trapping and killing six workers inside.  A second collapse on August 16, 2007, killed a Mine Safety and Health Administration investigator and two more miners, bringing the total to nine.

History
The road from SR-32 (by 1926 US-89) in Fairview east to the Sanpete-Emery County line, near the present north end of Electric Lake, was added to the state highway system in 1915. It was extended southeast to SR-10 in Huntington in 1918, and in 1927 the state legislature numbered the Fairview-Huntington highway as SR-31. A major realignment was made in 1976, when Electric Lake was created and a new route was built to the west. The old route in Sanpete County became a county road, and is now part of SR-264, but the majority of the road in Emery County was beneath the lake and thus abandoned.

Major intersections

See also

 List of state highways in Utah

References

External links

031
031
 031
 031